CTSH is the ticker symbol of Cognizant.

CTSH may also refer to
 CTSH (gene), a human gene which encodes the protein Cathepsin H

See also
 Cognizance (disambiguation)